Thomas Chung may refer to:

 Thomas Chung (poker player), American poker player 
 Thomas Chung (artist) (born 1988), American artist